The March is the fourth studio album by American metalcore band Unearth. The album was released on October 14, 2008, through Metal Blade Records. The album is a concept album and has a theme of "symbolizing both the evil and hopeful sides of humanity." This is also their sole album to feature drummer Derek Kerswill, who parted ways with the band in 2010.

Album information 
The album is a concept album as it represents both the evil and the hopeful sides of humanity. Lead singer Trevor Phipps discusses this idea:

The album was produced by Adam Dutkiewicz of Killswitch Engage, who had also worked the band's previous albums, The Stings of Conscience and The Oncoming Storm.

A version "The Chosen" originally appeared on the Aqua Teen Hunger Force Colon Movie Film for Theaters soundtrack.

The album art was designed by Sons of Nero.

The album debuted at #45 on the Billboard Top 200 chart with first week sales of just under 11,000 copies. Billboard later showed that "The March", as of early 2009, has sold over 100,000 units worldwide.

The song "Grave of Opportunity" is available as a free downloadable track for the popular console game Guitar Hero World Tour.

Also "We Are Not Anonymous" served as a downloadable content for the Rock Band series on the Rock Band Network Store for 160 Microsoft Points (Xbox Live)

Track listing

"Truth or Consequence" ends at 4:10, and "Our Callous Skin" fades at 3:12. Whichever song is the final track, after 30 seconds of silence, white noise can be heard, which then slowly fades in and becomes increasingly louder. After exactly two minutes, the white noise stops abruptly and a hidden track entitled "Silence Caught the Stubborn Tongue" begins, which continues, for the remainder of the album.

Special Edition Bonus DVD 

A "Special Edition" of the album (with slip cover) was released on Nov 10th, 2009. It includes a bonus DVD, which is over 80 minutes long. It contains 3 documentaries, 4 live videos, 3 official music videos, and 5 webisodes (originally streamed online during the album's recording). As a special promotion by Metal Blade Records, those who pre-ordered the album would receive an autographed copy (while supplies lasted).

Bonus DVD contents

 The Documentaries
 "Making The March"
 "The Three Day March"
 "Gig Life" 2009

 The Videos
 – Live at Wacken 2008 -
 "This Glorious Nightmare
 "My Heart Bleeds No Longer"
 "Black Hearts Now Reign"
 "The Great Dividers"

 "My Will Be Done" (Music Video)
 "Grave Of Opportunity (Music Video)
 "Crowkiller" (Music Video)

 Webisodes
 Preproduction with Adam D (Part 1)
 Preproduction with Adam D (Part 2)
 Recording Guitars
 Recording Vocals
 Recording Back Up Vocals with Norma Jean

Personnel
Production and performance credits are adapted from the album liner notes.

Personnel

Unearth
 Trevor Phipps – lead vocals
 Buz McGrath – guitar
 Ken Susi – guitar, backing vocals
 John "Slo" Maggard – bass, backing vocals
 Derek Kerswill – drums

Additional musicians
 Cory Brandan (Norma Jean) – additional vocals on "Grave of Opportunity", "We are not Anonymous"
 Chris Day (Norma Jean) – additional vocals on "Grave of Opportunity", "We are not Anonymous"
 Scottie Henry (ex-Norma Jean) – additional vocals on "Grave of Opportunity", "We are not Anonymous"
 Jake Schultz (ex-Norma Jean) – additional vocals on "Grave of Opportunity", "We are not Anonymous"
 Pat O'Donnell – additional vocals on "Grave of Opportunity", "We are not Anonymous"
 Wes Pannell – additional vocals on "Grave of Opportunity", "We are not Anonymous"

Production
 Adam Dutkiewicz – production, engineering
 Jim Fogarty – assistant engineering for drum tracking
 Andy Sneap – mixing, mastering
 Sons of Nero – concept, layout
 Travis Smith – photo illustration
 Phill Mamula – photography
 Chris Kabata – live photography

Studios 
 Zing Recording Studios, Westfield, MA – drums
 System Recordings, Grafton, MA – vocals, guitars, bass
 Backstage Recording Studios, UK – mixing, mastering

Charts

References

External links 
 
  The March at Metal Blade

2008 albums
Albums produced by Adam Dutkiewicz
Albums with cover art by Sons of Nero
Concept albums
Metal Blade Records albums
Unearth albums